Yasmin Nasr Elgewily (born 16 November 2001) is an Egyptian karateka. She won one of the bronze medals in the women's 50 kg event at the 2021 World Karate Championships held in Dubai, United Arab Emirates.

In 2018, she won the gold medal in the girls' 53 kg event at the Summer Youth Olympics held in Buenos Aires, Argentina. In 2021, she won the gold medal in the women's 50 kg event at the Mediterranean Karate Championships held in Limassol, Cyprus. She won the silver medal in her event at the 2021 African Karate Championships held in Cairo, Egypt.

Achievements

References

External links 

 

Living people
2001 births
Place of birth missing (living people)
Egyptian female karateka
Karateka at the 2018 Summer Youth Olympics
Youth Olympic gold medalists for Egypt
21st-century Egyptian women